

Shannon Conservation Park (formerly the Shannon Conservation Reserve) is a protected area in the Australian state of South Australia located on the Eyre Peninsula in the gazetted locality of Karkoo about  north of Port Lincoln and about  south  of Lock.

It was proclaimed under the National Parks and Wildlife Act 1972 in 2007 on land all in Section 100 of the cadastral unit of the Hundred of Shannon which was previously dedicated as a conservation reserve on 2 September 1993 under the Crown Lands Act 1929.

As of 2007, the Shannon Conservation Park was reported as being “dominated by mallee” and included a River Red Gum woodland which was considered to be “a regionally threatened community.”

As of 2007, there was no access for visitors into the interior of the conservation park and nor was there any plans to create such access.

The conservation park is classified as an IUCN Category VI protected area.

See also
Protected areas of South Australia

References

External links
Entry for Shannon Conservation Park on the Protected Planet website 

Conservation parks of South Australia
Protected areas established in 1993  
1993 establishments in Australia
Eyre Peninsula